The Queen of Ireland is a 2015 Irish documentary film directed by Conor Horgan. It focuses on Rory O'Neill, better known as Panti, in the lead up to the historic referendum on marriage equality for same-sex couples in Ireland in 2015. When the film debuted in Ireland, it had the highest ever grossing opening weekend for an Irish documentary.

Critical response
The film has been positively received, with Tara Brady of The Irish Times remarking that the "triumphant documentary deftly weaves through monumental moment of social history without losing sight of protagonist". Paul Whitington of The Irish Independent rated it 4 stars, while The Guardian also rated it 4 stars, writing that "Horgan’s film shapes up as a most pleasing portrait."

References

External links
  
 
 

2015 films
English-language Irish films
Irish documentary films
Irish LGBT-related films
Documentary films about gay men
Universal Pictures films
Films set in Dublin (city)
2015 LGBT-related films
2010s English-language films